Transcriptional-regulating factor 1 is a protein that in humans is encoded by the TRERF1 gene.

This gene encodes a zinc-finger transcriptional regulating protein that interacts with CBP/p300 to regulate the human gene CYP11A1.

Interactions 

TRERF1 has been shown to interact with Steroidogenic factor 1, EP300 and CREB-binding protein.

References

Further reading